Mauricio Ramos may refer to:

 Mauricio Ramos (Bolivian footballer) (born 1969), Bolivian football midfielder
 Maurício Ramos (Brazilian footballer) (born 1985), Brazilian football centre-back
 Mauricio Ramos (baseball) (born 1992), Colombian baseball player